Taï Phong is a French progressive rock band formed by two Vietnamese brothers, Khanh Maï (guitar, voice) and Taï Sinh (bass, guitar, voice, keyboards), in 1975.  They were joined by Jean-Alain Gardet (keyboards), Stephan Caussarieu (drums, percussion), and Jean-Jacques Goldman (guitar, voice, violin).

They released three albums between 1975 and 1979: Taï Phong (1975), Windows (1976), and Last Flight (1979). "Sister Jane" (1975), the first single from their first album, was a radio hit.

The band reunited in 2000 with Khanh Maï and Stephan Caussarieu. They are joined by Hervé Acosta (voice) and Angelo Zarzuelo (keyboards).

As of 2007, Khan Maï remains the only original member of the band.

Discography

Albums
 1975: Taï Phong
 1976: Windows
 1979: Last Flight
 2000: Sun
 2013: The Return of Samurai

Singles
1975: "Sister Jane" / "Crest"
1975: "(If You're Headed) North for Winter" / "Let Us Play"
1976: "Games" / "The Gulf of Knowledge"
1977: "Follow Me" / "Dance"
1978: "Back Again" / "Cherry"
1978: "Fed Up" / "Shanghai Casino"
1979: "Rise Above the Wind" (specially recorded for Sono)
1986: "I'm Your Son" / "Broken Dreams"

Bibliography
 Ludovic Lorenzi, Taï Phong : l'aventure continue, éd. Lorenzi, 2007.

References

External links
 Official website
 Album reviews

French progressive rock groups